Truly Madly Guilty is a 2016 novel by Australian author Liane Moriarty. It tells the story of Sam and Clementine, an ordinary yet busy married couple trying to balance work and family life. After the couple is invited by Clementine's old friend Erika to a neighbor's barbecue party, a spiral of intrigue, lust, and betrayal is unleashed. The book was published in July 2016 by Flatiron Books.

Just weeks after the novel's release, it was announced that Reese Witherspoon and Nicole Kidman had optioned for the novel's film rights. At the time, Witherspoon and Kidman had already begun producing a television miniseries adaptation of Moriarty's previous novel, Big Little Lies.

Awards
 2016: Goodreads Choice Awards, Best Fiction

References

2016 Australian novels
Flatiron Books books
Michael Joseph books